Maria Station is a commuter train railway station located on the West Coast Line in the northern parts of Helsingborg, Sweden. The station was inaugurated in 1999 and currently consists of two platforms and two tracks. The local trains (Pågatåg) serve the station.

Expansion plans

With the expansion of Mariastaden and the Maria station area, travel from the station is expected to increase and to meet the capacity requirement, the station is planned to be expanded to four tracks. The expansion to four tracks is also carried out to enable increased traffic through Helsingborg's central station, by using Maria station as a turning point for returning trains instead of Knutpunkten. The rebuilding of the station will either take place in connection with the expansion of the Maria station–Ängelholm section to double track, or the construction of the Tågaborg Tunnel. When the construction of the Tågaborg tunnel can be carried out is still unclear, but the double-track expansion of the Västkustbanan between Maria station and Ängelholm was started in 2020.

See also
Rail transport in Sweden

References

Railway stations in Helsingborg
Railway stations on the West Coast Line (Sweden)
Railway stations opened in 1999
1999 establishments in Sweden
Buildings and structures completed in 1999
20th-century establishments in Skåne County